FK Jedinstvo or NK Jedinstvo may refer to a number of association football clubs based in the former Yugoslavia. 
"Jedinstvo" is the Serbo-Croatian word for "unity", while FK and NK are two variants of the Serbo-Croatian abbreviation for "FC", standing for "football club" (i.e. fudbalski klub or nogometni klub).

Thus, the term may refer to:
, Serbian football club based in Bačko Petrovo Selo
NK Jedinstvo Bihać, Bosnian football club based in Bihać, active since 1919
FK Jedinstvo Bijelo Polje, Montenegrin football club based in Bijelo Polje, active since 1922
FK Jedinstvo Bošnjace, Serbian football club based in Bošnjace
FK Jedinstvo Brčko, Bosnian football club based in Brčko, active since 1919
FK Jedinstvo Brodac, Bosnian football club based in Brodac, active since 1930
FK Jedinstvo Crkvina, Bosnian football club based in Crkvina
FK Jedinstvo Donja Mutnica, Serbian football club based in Donja Mutnica
FK Jedinstvo Kačarevo, Serbian football club based in Kačarevo
FK Jedinstvo Mali Zvornik, Serbian football club based in Mali Zvornik, active since 1967
FK Jedinstvo Morović, Serbian football club based in Morović
FK Jedinstvo Novi Bečej, Serbian football club based in Novi Bečej
FK Jedinstvo Paraćin, Serbian football club based in Paraćin, active since 1925
FK Jedinstvo Pirot, Serbian football club based in Pirot
FK Jedinstvo Ruma, Serbian football club based in Ruma
, Serbian football club based in Stara Pazova
FK Jedinstvo Surčin, Serbian football club based in Surčin, active since 1928
FK Jedinstvo Ub, Serbian football club based in Ub, active since 1920
FK Jedinstvo Užice, Serbian football club based in Užice, active since 1961
FK Jedinstvo Vladimirci, Serbian football club based in Vladimirci
FK Jedinstvo Žeravica, Bosnian football club based in Žeravica

See also
FK Mladost (disambiguation)